A new town is a generic name for a planned community, or a planned expansion of a community.

New Town may also refer to:

Town planning 
New town (Alberta), a former municipal status in Alberta, Canada, from 1956
New towns of Hong Kong, since the 1950s
New towns of Singapore, since 1952
New towns in the United Kingdom, designated under Acts of Parliament since 1946
New towns movement

Places

Australia
New Town, South Australia, a suburb of Kadina
New Town, Tasmania, a suburb of Hobart

Canada

 New Town, former name of Montreal neighbourhood Golden Square Mile

China
Zhujiang New Town, Guangzhou, Guangdong Province

Czech Republic
New Town, Prague (Nové Město), a district of Prague

Finland
Uusikaupunki ("New Town" in Finnish)

Ghana
New Town, Ghana, Western Region

India
Rajarhat, also called New Town, Kolkata
New Town, Kolkata

Japan
Tama New Town, Tama, Tokyo
Senboku New Town, Osaka

Malta
Paola, Malta, also known as Raħal Ġdid (new town in Maltese)

Pakistan
New Town, Karachi, also called Binori Town

Poland
Warsaw New Town, an old district of Warsaw

Slovakia
Nové Mesto, Bratislava (New Town in English), a borough in Bratislava

Slovenia
Novo mesto (New Town in English)

United Kingdom
New Town, Birmingham, an inner-city district of Birmingham, West Midlands
New Town, Luton, a district of Luton, Bedfordshire
New Town, Stevenage, Hertfordshire
New Town, Southampton, a district of the city of Southampton, Hampshire
New Town, Walsall, a district of Walsall, West Midlands
New Town, Enford, Wiltshire
New Town, Ramsbury, Wiltshire
New Town (Colchester electoral ward), an electoral ward in Colchester, Essex
New Town, Edinburgh, the centre of Edinburgh

United States
New Town, California, the former name of Nubieber, California
New Town, California, the former name of Newtown, El Dorado County, California
New Town (Jacksonville), a neighborhood in Jacksonville, Florida
New Town (Key West), a neighborhood within the City of Key West, Florida
New Town, Georgia
New Town, Louisiana, the former British name of New Iberia, Louisiana
New Town, North Dakota
New Town, South Carolina, the former name of Myrtle Beach
New Town, a historically African American neighborhood in Marshall, Texas
Newe Towne, the former name of Cambridge, Massachusetts
 New Towne Mall, a shopping mall in New Philadelphia, Ohio

Zimbabwe
New Town, Kwekwe, a suburb of Kwekwe

Music

New Town (Jandek album)
New Town (Koop Arponen album)

See also
Newton (disambiguation)
Newtown (disambiguation)
Newtonville (disambiguation)
Garden city movement